The John Warrick Cycles company was established by John Warrick, the son of a Reading bargee. He was originally a gunsmith, apprenticed to William Soper, and together they had success manufacturing complex and highly accurate but slightly unreliable rifles.  Warrick himself was a member of the Berkshire Volunteers and was an excellent marksman, using his medals and competition victories to promote the company.

After some years the market in guns declined and Warrick turned his attention to the growing trade of bicycle manufacturing. He used both the Warrick and Monarch brands in their factory on Caversham Road, Reading. The factory lasted until the 1970s, passing on to William Warrick, his son. They exported bicycles, including supplying Orville and Wilbur Wright's cycle business.

The company specialised in delivery and later motorized tricycles, especially for ice-cream and for food delivery although they did supply organisations such as the Army Cycle Corps and several department stores. One of their bicycles can be found in Reading Museum. Many were used by ice cream vendors in the mid-twentieth century, and requisitioned in the Second World War to act as aircraft simulators, with radio equipment in the ice cream box and with vision restricted so that they could only be driven by instructions.

The trade mark on Warrick bicycles was a metal triangle on the top of the rear mudguard of the cycle.

They also constructed batteries for electric cars and vans, although their early attempts at producing electric cars themselves were less successful.

Whilst their factory was located on Caversham Road by Northfield Road, they ran a shop in Reading at 24 St Mary's Butts and on Edgware Road in London. In later years they stopped making bicycles and moved on to enamelling, electroplating and other contract work, including making some parts for the prototype of the Concorde aircraft.

External links
Company history
Information about threewheelers

Defunct cycle manufacturers of the United Kingdom
Companies based in Reading, Berkshire